Thomas Meakin Lockwood (1830 – 15 July 1900) was an English architect whose main works are in and around Chester, Cheshire.   He was born in London, and brought up in East Anglia.  From 1851 he was articled to Philip Causton Lockwood, the Borough Surveyor of Brighton.  He then worked in offices including that of George Woodhouse, and of T. M. Penson in Chester. In 1862 he established an independent practice in Chester.  His works are located mainly in Cheshire, Shropshire, and North Wales, his designs being influenced by John Douglas and Norman Shaw.  These are frequently either timber-framed, or in brick and stone incorporating Tudor, Elizabethan and Renaissance features.  In Cheshire and North Wales, his most important patron was the First Duke of Westminster.  Lockwood's most prominent buildings, which stand at Chester Cross, were commissioned by the Duke.  They stand on opposite corners at the north end of Bridge Street, and are in contrasting styles. Number 1 Bridge Street, built in 1888, is timber-framed in Black-and-white Revival style.  Number 2–8 Bridge Street, built in 1894, is in stone and diapered brick, and incorporates Tudor, Jacobean and Baroque features. Lockwood also designed the Grosvenor Museum, also in Chester, and built in 1885–86.  It is constructed in red brick, and is in Renaissance style with Dutch gables.

In 1892 Lockwood's sons, William Thomas and Philip H. Lockwood, joined him in partnership; the practice was known as T. M. Lockwood and Sons, and was continued by his sons after his death.  According to the architectural historian Edward Hubbard, Lockwood is the only 19th-century Chester architect other than John Douglas to have acquired a national reputation.  A memorial window to his memory is in the north aisle of St John the Baptist's Church, Chester.

See also
List of works by Thomas Lockwood

References

Bibliography

 

1830 births
1900 deaths
19th-century English architects
Architects from Cheshire